YoungArts (previously National YoungArts Foundation and National Foundation for Advancement in the Arts, or NFAA) is an American charity established in 1981 by Lin and Ted Arison to help nurture emerging high-school artists. The foundation is based in Miami, Florida. Alumni of the program include Timothée Chalamet, Jessica Darrow, Kerry Washington, Matt Bomer, Billy Porter, Anna Gunn, Andrew Rannells, Kimiko Glenn, Ben Levi Ross, Sam Lipsyte, Chris Young, Neal Dodson, Viola Davis, Nicki Minaj, Doug Aitken, and Max Schneider.

In 1981, Ted Arison gave $5 million to launch the National Foundation for Advancement in the Arts.

YoungArts nominates up to 60 candidates for consideration as U.S. Presidential Scholars in the Arts following participation in YoungArts week.

YoungArts disciplines
The YoungArts application consists of ten disciplines across the visual, literary, design and performing arts:
Classical Music – composition and instrumental
Dance – ballet, choreography, hip hop, jazz, modern, tap, and world dance forms
Design Arts - architecture, interior, product, graphic, fashion and theater design
Film – narrative, documentary, experimental, and animation
Jazz – composers and instrumentalists
Photography
Theater – musical, classical and contemporary spoken theater
Visual Arts
Voice – classical, jazz, popular and singer/songwriter
Writing – creative non-fiction, novel, play or script, poetry, short story, spoken word

Other programs and activities
Several documentaries have been produced highlighting this unique program and its award recipients. Most notably, Rehearsing a Dream, produced by the Simon and Goodman Picture Company, was nominated for the Academy Award for Documentary Short Subject. A documentary television series entitled YoungArts MasterClass, in which program alumni are teamed with famous mentors, is in its second season on HBO. YoungArts has developed a study guide, based on the HBO series, for high school teachers with Teachers College, Columbia University.

Alumni opportunities
Every YoungArts winner becomes a part of the YoungArts alumni community, an artistic family of more than 20,000 alumni. YoungArts makes open calls to alumni to provide opportunities and inclusion in its programming and events.

Budget
YoungArts has an endowment of $42 million. Its $6 million annual budget is expected to increase as much as 40 percent as its operating expenses grow.

References

External links
 YoungArts website
 Presidential Scholars Program

Arts foundations based in the United States
Educational foundations in the United States
Scholarships in the United States